Moideen Shahul Hameed (born 26 November 1970) is an Indonesian cricket umpire. He stood in ten ODI games between 2006 and 2007. Hameed was a member of the International Cricket Council (ICC) Associate and Affiliate Panel of Umpires from 2006 until 2014.

See also
 List of One Day International cricket umpires

References

1970 births
Living people
Indonesian cricket umpires
Indonesian One Day International cricket umpires
Indian emigrants to Indonesia
Indian cricket umpires